Sebaea is a genus of annual plants in the family Gentianaceae. Species occur in Africa, Madagascar, India, China, Thailand, Australia and New Zealand. The genus was paraphyletic and has been split in four genera: Exochaenium, Klackenbergia, Lagenias and Sebaea s.str.. Synapomorphies for Sebaea s.str. include the presence of extra stigma along the style (called diplostigmaty) and the shape of the testa cells of the seeds.

The name honors Albertus Seba (1665–1736), a Dutch pharmacist, zoologist and collector.

Species include (non exhaustiv list):

Sebaea albens (L. f.) Roem. & Schult.
Sebaea albidiflora  F.Muell. - white sebaea
Sebaea ambigua Cham.
Sebaea amicorum I.M. Oliv. & Beyers
Sebaea aurea (L. f.) Roem. & Schult.
Sebaea bojeri Griseb.
Sebaea brachyphylla Griseb.
Sebaea capitata Cham. & Schlechtdl.
var. capitata Cham. & Schlechtdl.
var. sclerosepala (Schinz) Marais
Sebaea chironioides Gilg
Sebaea elongata E. Mey.
Sebaea erosa Schinz
Sebaea exacoides (L.) Schinz
Sebaea exigua (Oliv.) Schinz
Sebaea filiformis Schinz
Sebaea fourcadei Marais
Sebaea grisebachiana Schinz
Sebaea hymenosepala Gilg
Sebaea junodii Schinz
Sebaea laxa N.E.Br.
Sebaea leiostyla Gilg
Sebaea longicaulis Schinz
Sebaea macrophylla Gilg
Sebaea marlothii Gilg
Sebaea membranaceae Hill
Sebaea microphylla (Edgew.) Knobl.
Sebaea micrantha (Cham. & Schlechtdel.) Schinz
var. micrantha (Cham. & Schlechtdel.) Schinz
var. intermedia (Cham. & Schlechtdel.) Marais
Sebaea minutiflora Schinz
Sebaea minutissima Hilliard & B.L.Burtt
Sebaea natalensis Schinz
Sebaea ovata (Labill.) R. Br. - yellow sebaea, yellow centaury
Sebaea pentendra E. Mey.
var. burchellii (Gilg) Marais
var. pentendra E. Mey.
Sebaea pleurostigmatosa Hilliard & B.L. Burtt
Sebaea procumbens A.W. Hill
Sebaea radiata Hilliard & B.L.Burtt
Sebaea ramosissima Gilg
Sebaea rara W. Dod
Sebaea rehmannii Schinz
Sebaea repens Schinz
Sebaea scabra Schinz
Sebaea schlechteri Schinz
Sebaea sedoides Gilg
var. confertiflora (Schinz) Marais
var. sedoides Gilg
var. schoenlandii (Schinz) Marais
Sebaea solaris Kissling
Sebaea spathulata Steud.
Sebaea stricta (E. Mey.) Gilg
Sebaea sulphurea Cham. & Schlechtdl.
Sebaea thomasii Schinz
Sebaea zeyheri Schinz
var. acutiloba (Schinz) Marais
var. cleistantha (R.A. Dyer) Marais
var. zeyheri Schinz

References

Gentianaceae
Gentianaceae genera